Pattariyar is Hindu community residing in the Indian states of Tamil Nadu and Kerala. They are one of the principal weaving castes of South India and were known for silk-weaving. The titles of Pattariyars are Pillai, Mudaliar or Setty.

Pattariyar means the Aryas who made silk, They are noted as being Tamil migrants, with their name being a corruption of Pattusaliyar. According to mythology, Pattariyars migrated to its present habitat from Kanchipuram in Tamil Nadu. This migration is recalled in oral tradition. It is learnt that their migration was due to the quarrel with the king of Kanchipuram long ago. They also claim to have come from North India as silk weavers. 

The present abodes of the Kalakad Pattaryans are Veeravanallur, Pattamadai and Eraniel. Koranad and the Kottar Pattaryars are confined to Kottar, Tamil Nadu. In Kerala, The Pattaryas are distributed in Alappuzha, Kottayam, Ernakulam and Thrissur districts. There are many Pattariyar families in the Cherthala and Vaikom taluks and in Pallippuram panchayath of Cherthala taluk.

See also
Pattusali
Adaviyar

References

Indian castes
Social groups of Kerala
Social groups of Tamil Nadu
Weaving communities of South Asia